Arturo Porro (1890 – 1967) was an Italian middle-distance runner who competed at the 1920 Summer Olympics.

References

External links
 

1890 births
1967 deaths
Athletes from Milan
Athletes (track and field) at the 1920 Summer Olympics
Italian male middle-distance runners
Olympic athletes of Italy